Mikhail Goussarov (March 8, 1958, Leningrad – June 25, 1999, Tel Aviv) was a Soviet mathematician who worked in low-dimensional topology.  He and Victor Vassiliev independently discovered finite type invariants of knots and links.  He drowned at the age of 41 in an accident in Tel Aviv, Israel.

See also 
Memorial page maintained by Dror Bar-Natan.

1958 births
1999 deaths
20th-century Russian mathematicians
Deaths by drowning
Accidental deaths in Israel